The 2019–20 Yale Bulldogs Men's ice hockey season was the 125th season of play for the program and the 59th season in the ECAC Hockey conference. The Bulldogs represented Yale University and were coached by Keith Allain, in his 14th season.

On March 11, Yale withdrew from the ECAC Tournament over concerns from the COVID-19 pandemic. A day later ECAC Hockey cancelled the remainder of the championship.

Season
After winning their First Round match, the administration at Yale withdrew from the ECAC Tournament over health concerns due to the coronavirus pandemic.

Departures

Recruiting

Roster
As of July 12, 2019.

Standings

Schedule and results

|-
!colspan=12 style=";" | Exhibition

|-
!colspan=12 style=";" | Regular Season

|-
!colspan=12 style=";" | 

|-
!colspan=12 style=";" | 

|- align="center" bgcolor="#e0e0e0"
|colspan=12|Yale Won Series 2–1
|- align="center" bgcolor="#e0e0e0"
|colspan=12|Withdrew from Tournament

Scoring statistics

Goaltending statistics

Rankings

Awards and honors

ECAC Hockey

Players drafted into the NHL

2020 NHL Entry Draft
No Yale players were selected in the NHL draft.

References

Yale Bulldogs men's ice hockey seasons
Yale Bulldogs
Yale Bulldogs
Yale Bulldogs men's ice hockey
Yale Bulldogs men's ice hockey